The Shawnee language is a Central Algonquian language spoken in parts of central and northeastern Oklahoma by the Shawnee people. It was originally spoken by these people in a broad territory throughout the Eastern United States, mostly north of the Ohio River. They occupied territory in Ohio, West Virginia, Kentucky, and Pennsylvania.

Shawnee is closely related to other Algonquian languages, such as Mesquakie-Sauk (Sac and Fox) and Kickapoo. It has 260 speakers, according to a 2015 census, although the number is decreasing. It is a polysynthetic language with rather free word ordering.

Status 
Shawnee is severely threatened, as many speakers have shifted to English. The approximately 200 remaining speakers are older adults. Some of the decline in usage of Shawnee is the result of the assimilation program carried out by Indian boarding schools, which abused, starved, and beat children who spoke their native language. This treatment often extended to the family of those children as well.

Of the 2,000 members of the Absentee Shawnee Tribe around the city of Shawnee, more than 100 are speakers; of the 1,500 members of the Eastern Shawnee Tribe in Ottawa County, only a few elders are speakers; of the 8,000 members of the Loyal Shawnee in the Cherokee region of Oklahoma around Whiteoak, there are fewer than 12 speakers. Because of such low figures and the percentage of elderly speakers, Shawnee is classified as an endangered language. Additionally, development outside of the home has been limited. Apart from a dictionary and portions of the Bible translated from 1842 to 1929, there is little literature or technology support for Shawnee.

Language revitalization

Absentee-Shawnee Elder George Blanchard, Sr, former governor of his tribe, teaches classes to Head Start and elementary school children, as well as evening classes for adults, at the Cultural Preservation Center in Seneca, Missouri. His work was profiled on the PBS show American Experience in 2009. The classes are intended to encourage use of Shawnee among families at home. The Eastern Shawnee have also taught language classes.

Conversational Shawnee booklets and CDs, and a Learn Shawnee Language website are available.

Phonology

Vowels

Shawnee has six vowels, three of which are high, and three are low.

(1)  'he was in charge'

(2)  'dog'

(3)  'all this'

(4)  'small' 

Consonants

Shawnee consonants are shown in the chart below.

The Shawnee  is most often derived from Proto-Algonquian *s.

Some speakers of Shawnee pronounce  more like an alveolar . This pronunciation is especially common among Loyal Band Shawnee speakers near Vinita, Oklahoma.

// and /h/ are allophones of the same phoneme: // occurs in syllable final position, while  occurs at the beginning of a syllable.

Stress 
Stress in Shawnee falls on the final syllable (ultima) of a word.

Consonant length
In Shawnee phonology, consonant length is contrastive. Shawnee does not allow word-final consonants and long vowels.
 and  contrast in the following verbal affixes

These affixes are object markers in the transitive animate subordinate mode. The subject is understood.

[h] Insertion

∅→[h]/#V
A word may not begin with a vowel. Instead, an on-glide  is added. For example:
There are two variants of the article , meaning 'from'. It can attach to nouns to form prepositional phrases, or it can also be a preverb.

/y/ Insertion

∅→[y]/V(:)_ V(:)

Word-final Consonant Deletion

C# → 0

A consonant is deleted at the end of a word.

In (a), a noun ends in a consonant when a locative suffix follows, but in (b), the consonant is deleted at word end.

Word-final Vowel Shortening

V:# → V#

A long vowel is shortened at the end of a word.

Morphology

Morpho-phonology

Rule 1

t/VV
[t] is inserted between two vowels at morpheme boundary.
As we know from the phonological rule stated above, a word may not begin with a vowel in Shawnee. From the morphophonological rule above, it can be assumed that ~.
example

Rule 2

V1-V2-----> V2
A short vowel preceding another short vowel at a morpheme boundary is deleted.

Rule 3

V:V------> V:
When a long vowel and a short vowel come together at a morpheme boundary, the short vowel is deleted.

Shawnee shares many grammatical features with other Algonquian languages. There are two third persons, proximate and obviative, and two noun classes (or genders), animate and inanimate. It is primarily agglutinating typologically, and is polysynthetic, resulting in a great deal of information being encoded on the verb. The most common word order is Verb-Subject.

Affixes

stem-(instrumental affix)-transitivizing affix-object affix 
The instrumental affix is not obligatory, but if it is present, it determines the type of transitivizing affix that can follow it, (see numbering scheme below) or by the last stem in the theme. 
Instrumental affixes are as follows

Possessive paradigm: animate nouns

Possessive paradigm: inanimate nouns

-tθani (w)- 'bed'

Grammar and syntax

Word order
Shawnee has a fairly free word order, with VSO being the most common:

SOV, SVO, VOS, and OVS are also plausible.

Grammatical categories
Parts of speech in the Algonquian languages, Shawnee included, show a basic division between inflecting forms (nouns, verbs and pronouns), and non-inflecting invariant forms (also known as particles). Directional particles ( meaning 'towards') incorporate into the verb itself. Although particles are invariant in form, they have different distributions and meanings that correspond to adverbs ( meaning 'now',  meaning 'today',  meaning 'so, certainly',  meaning 'not') postpositions ( meaning 'towards the east') and interjections ( meaning 'so!').

Case
Examples (1) and (2) below show the grammatical interaction of obviation and inverse. The narrative begins in (1) in which grandfather is the grammatical subject [+AGENT] in discourse-focus [+PROXIMATE]. In (2), grandfather remains in discourse-focus [+PROXIMATE], but he is now the grammatical object [+OBJECT]. To align grammatical relations properly in (2), the inverse marker /-ekw-/ is used in the verb stem to signal that the governor is affecting grandfather. (The prefix  on  refers to 'grandfather').

Since the person building the house (the governor) is disjoint from the person who the house is being built for (the grandfather), this disjunction is marked by placing one participant in the obviative. Since grandfather is the focus in this narrative, the governor is assigned the obviative marking. Grammatically,  (-ee- < -ile- < -ileni- 'person') is the subject who is not in discourse-focus (marked by  3sOBVIATIVE), showing that grammatical relations and obviation are independent categories.

Similar interactions of inverse and obviation are found below. In Shawnee, third person animate beings participate in obviation, including grammatically animate nouns that are semantically inanimate.

Locative affix 
The Shawnee  meaning 'in' can be used with either gender. This locative affix cliticizes onto the preceding noun, and thus it appears to be a case ending.

Modality
The independent and imperative orders are used in independent clauses. The imperative order involves an understood second person affecting first or third persons.

Independent Mode: 
Inanimate Intransitive (II): 
3s---> /-i/ --->  'it is red' 
3p---> /-a/ --->  'those are long'

Demonstrative pronouns
Refer to the examples below.  meaning 'this' in examples 1 and 2 refers to someone in front of the speaker.

Refer to the examples below.  functions as a third-person singular pronoun.

Refer to the examples below.  fulfills the same functions as above for inanimate nouns. Locational and third-person singular pronominal uses are found in the following examples.

Person, number, and gender

Person

The choice of person affix may depend on the relative position of agent and object on the animacy hierarchy. According to Dixon  the animacy hierarchy extends from first-person pronoun, second-person pronoun, third-person pronoun, proper nouns, human common nouns, animate common nouns, and inanimate common nouns.

The affixes in the verb will reflect whether an animate agent is acting on someone or something lower in the animacy scale, or whether he or she is being acted upon by someone or something lower in the animacy scale.

Number 
Shawnee nouns can be singular or plural. Inflectional affixes in the verb stem that cross-reference objects are often omitted if inanimate objects are involved. Even if an inflectional affix for the inanimate object is present, it usually does not distinguish number. For example, in the TI paradigm (animate›inanimate) when there is a second or third person plural subject, object markers are present in the verb stem, but they are number-indifferent. Overt object markers are omitted for most other subjects. In the inverse situation, (animate‹inanimate) the inanimate participants are not cross-referenced morphologically.

Gender

The basic distinction for gender in Shawnee is between animate actors and inanimate objects. Nouns are in two gender classes, inanimate and animate; the latter includes all persons, animals, spirits, and large trees, and some other objects such as tobacco, maize, apple, raspberry (but not strawberry), calf of leg (but not thigh), stomach, spittle, feather, bird's tail, horn, kettle, pipe for smoking, snowshoe.

Grammatical gender in Shawnee is more accurately signaled by the phonology, not the semantics.
This phonological criterion is not absolute. Modification by a demonstrative ( being animate and  being inanimate, meaning 'that') and pluralization are conclusive tests.

Shawnee inanimate nouns are usually pluralized with stem +. 
This causes animate obviative singular and inanimate plural to look alike on the surface.

example

animate obviative singular

bird

inanimate plural

my teeth

Orthography

During the 19th century a short-lived Roman-based alphabet was designed for Shawnee by the missionary Jotham Meeker. It was never widely used. Later, native Shawnee speaker Thomas 'Wildcat' Alford devised a highly phonemic and accurate orthography for his 1929 Shawnee translation of the four gospels of the New Testament, but it, too, never attained wide usage.

Vocabulary

Notes

Further reading

Alford, Thomas Wildcat. 1929. The Four Gospels of Our Lord Jesus Christ in Shawnee Indian Language. Xenia, Ohio: Dr. W. A. Galloway.
Andrews, Kenneth. 1994. Shawnee Grammar. Unpublished Dissertation, University of South Carolina, Columbia.
Costa, David J. 2001. Shawnee Noun Plurals. Anthropological Linguistics 43: 255-287.
Costa, David J. 2002. Preverb Usage in Shawnee Narratives. In H. C. Wolfart, ed., Papers of the 33rd Algonquian Conference, 120-161. Winnipeg: University of Manitoba.

Voegelin, Carl F. 1935. Shawnee Phonemes. Language 11: 23-37.
Voegelin, Carl F. 1936. Productive Paradigms in Shawnee. Robert H. Lowie, ed., Essays in Anthropology presented to A. L. Kroeber 391-403. Berkeley: University of California Press.
Voegelin, Carl F. 1938-40. Shawnee Stems and the Jacob P. Dunn Miami Dictionary. Indiana Historical Society Prehistory Research Series 1: 63-108, 135-167, 289-323, 345-406, 409-478 (1938–1940). Indianapolis.

External links

Albert Gatschet's notes on the Shawnee language
OLAC resources in and about the Shawnee language
Shawnee language vocabulary

Algonquian languages
Indigenous languages of Oklahoma
Indigenous languages of the North American eastern woodlands
Shawnee
Endangered indigenous languages of the Americas